Veillantif (French), Vielantiu (Old French); Vegliantin, Vegliantino or Brigliadoro (Italian) is the name of Roland the paladin's trustworthy and swift steed in the stories derived from the chansons de geste.  The French name comes from an expression meaning "vigilant". Veillantif is first mentioned in The Song of Roland (v. 2032; laisse 151).

Veillantif was given various origins. In the 12th century chanson de geste Aspremont, the horse is said to have formerly been in the possession of King Agolant's son Aumon. After Aumon's defeat, the horse (and his sword Durendal) was given to Roland.

Andrea da Barberino's (1370–1431) Italian prose adaptation L'Aspramonte stated that the horse was called Briadoro when it belonged to Almonte (Aumon), but renamed Vegliantino after being conquered by Orlandino ("little Roland"). Luigi Pulci's (1432–1484) Morgante refers to the horse as Vegliantino whereas Matteo Maria Boiardo's (1440–1494) Orlando Innamorato and Ludovico Ariosto's (1474–1533) Orlando Furioso used "Brigliadoro", Italian for "bridle of gold".

See also
 Bayard, Rinaldo/Renaud's magical horse
 List of historical horses
 List of fictional horses

Explanatory notes

References
Citations

Bibliography

texts
; volume 2 (1921). 
Brault, Gerard J., ed. (1978), The Song of Roland: An Analytical Edition, Pennsylvania State University. 
 
 

translations

{{citation|ref=|author=Ludovico Ariosto |editor-last=Reynolds |editor-first=Barbara |author-link=Barbara Reynolds |title=Orlando Furioso, in two volumes |publisher=Penguin |year=1975 |url=https://books.google.com/books?id=W6nHA-fYkdYC&pg=PT103}} Part one (cantos 1-23) ; part two (cantos 24-46) .
 
 Combarieu du Grès, Micheline de, and Subrenat, Jean, ed., (1983), Les Quatre Fils Aymon'', Paris: Gallimard, .  

Characters in The Song of Roland
Fictional characters introduced in the 11th century
Horses in mythology